Men, Women, and Money is a lost 1919 American drama silent film directed by George Melford and written by Beulah Marie Dix and Cosmo Hamilton. The film stars Ethel Clayton, James Neill, Jane Wolfe, Lew Cody, Sylvia Ashton, Irving Cummings, and Winifred Greenwood. The film was released on June 15, 1919, by Paramount Pictures.

Plot
As described in a film magazine, left an orphan with $2,000 in cash, Marcel Middleton (Clayton) goes to visit some friends in New York City, where her phenomenal luck in bridge nets her funds for her support. Innocently, she falls in with a fast crowd and finds making ends meet a difficult task. Cleveland Buchanan (Cody) and Julian Chadwick (Cummings) become suitors, but their proposals do not include matrimony. With her luck at cards failing, she becomes indebted to Buchanan. When she refuses his attentions, he resolves to make himself worthy of her honest love and reforms himself. When Marcel obtains an engagement as a cloak model for fashionable customers, Chadwick makes plans for her ruin, but Buchanan rescues her in time and they are married.

Cast
Ethel Clayton as Marcel Middleton
James Neill as Parker Middleton
Jane Wolfe as Sara Middleton
Lew Cody as Cleveland Buchanan
Sylvia Ashton as Aunt Hannah
Irving Cummings as Julian Chadwick
Winifred Greenwood as Noel Parkton
Edna Mae Cooper as Miss Cote
Leslie Stuart as Toto 
Mayme Kelso as Madame Ribout
Lillian Leighton as Mrs. Weeks
Lallah Rookh Hart as Miss Dunston 
ZaSu Pitts as Katie Jones
Fay Holderness as Mrs. Parkton
Helen Dunbar as Mrs. Channing
Charles Ogle as Dr. Malcolm Lloyd
Marie Newall as Cora

References

External links 

 
 

1919 films
1910s English-language films
Silent American drama films
1919 drama films
Paramount Pictures films
Lost American films
Films directed by George Melford
American black-and-white films
American silent feature films
1919 lost films
Lost drama films
1910s American films